Aglaops homaloxantha is a moth in the family Crambidae. It was described by Edward Meyrick in 1933. It is found on Fiji.

References

MEYRICK'S RECORD OF "MECYNA FURNACALIS, GN." FROM FIJI, WITH A NEW GENERIC ASSIGNMENT FOR PYRAUSTA HOMALOXANTHA MEYRICK (PYRALIDAE: PYRAUSTINAE)

Moths described in 1933
Pyraustinae
Moths of Fiji